Rafik Kabou (born 28 October 1992) is a Tunisian footballer who plays as a forward for Egyptian Premier League side ENPPI.

Club career 
On 1 October 2022, Kabou signed a three-year contract with ENPPI. His debut came against Pyramids, where he scored in a 1–1 tie.

References

External links 
 

1992 births
Living people
Tunisian footballers
Association football forwards
US Monastir (football) players
ENPPI SC players
Smouha SC players
Wadi Degla SC players
US Ben Guerdane players
CS Sfaxien players
Egyptian Premier League players
Tunisian Ligue Professionnelle 1 players